The Antonín Dvořák Museum is a museum in Prague in the Czech Republic dedicated to the Czech composer Antonín Dvořák.

Description
The Antonín Dvořák Museum is part of the Czech Museum of Music which in turn is part of the National Museum. Since 1932, the museum has been housed in a Baroque style building which was designed by the architect Kilian Ignaz Dientzenhofer at the beginning of the 18th century, even though the house itself has no particular link with the Dvořák. It is situated in the north part of the New Town.

The museum displays photographs, newspaper cuttings, programmes and personal objects relating to the composer, including his viola and his piano. The building houses a unique collection of his manuscripts and correspondence, thus providing an important centre for research into Antonín Dvořák. Concerts are held there regularly, as well as seminars, lectures, and exhibitions.

The museum also organizes an annual ceremony on the eve of the day of his death (1 May) at his grave in the Vyšehrad cemetery just south of the New Town district. There is also a matinee celebration on his birthday at his birthplace in Nelahozeves. The museum also takes care of the village house of his son-in-law, Josef Suk. There are also commemorative centres connected with Dvořák at other locations: there is a permanent exhibition at his country estate in Vysoká near Příbram, one in Zlonice and a memorial hall in Sychrov Castle near Turnov.

See also
List of music museums

References

Collections of the National Museum in Prague
Museums in Prague
Music museums in the Czech Republic
Biographical museums in the Czech Republic
Museum